Koroma is a common surname among the Mende, Temne, Limba, and Loko people of Sierra Leone. The word Koroma originates from the Hassaniya Arabic word كوروما, kurumana. People with the surname Koroma are predominantly Muslim. The name Koroma may refer to:

 Abdul Koroma, former Sierra Leonean judge at the International Court of Justice
 Abdul Karim Koroma, Sierra Leonean politician
 Alimamy Koroma, Sierra Leone's minister of trade and industry
 Brima Koroma, Sierra Leonean footballer
 Ernest Bai Koroma, president of Sierra Leone from 2007 until 2018
 Francis Koroma, former Sierra Leonean footballer
 Johnny Paul Koroma, Sierra Leonean Head of State 1997-1998
 Josh Koroma, English footballer
 Momodu Koroma, Sierra Leone's foreign minister from 2002-2007
 Sorie Ibrahim Koroma, former Vice President of Sierra Leone
 Tejan Koroma, American football player

Surnames of African origin